Roaring Fork is a stream in the Great Smoky Mountains of Tennessee, located in the Southeastern United States. Once the site of a small Appalachian community, today the stream's area is home to the Roaring Fork Motor Nature Trail and the Roaring Fork Historic District.

Like many mountain streams, Roaring Fork is volatile. While the stream presents as a peaceful trickle on any given day, it quickly becomes a raging whitewater rapid after a mild rain shower. The "roar" of the water is amplified by its echo on surrounding mountain ridges.

Geography

The source of Roaring Fork is located nearly  up along the northern slopes of Mount Le Conte, where several small springs converge. The highest of these springs, known as Basin Spring, provides the water source for LeConte Lodge.  From its source, Roaring Fork drops  over just , spilling over Grotto Falls and absorbing Surry Creek before steadying in a narrow valley between Mount Winnesoka and Piney Mountain. The mouth of Roaring Fork is located at the northern end of Gatlinburg, where it empties into the West Fork of the Little Pigeon River.

The Roaring Fork valley is underlain by Precambrian sandstone of the Ocoee Supergroup, a rock formation formed from ancient ocean sediments nearly a billion years ago. Roaring Fork Sandstone is found throughout the mid-level elevations of the northern Smokies, and is especially common in Greenbrier to the east and the Sugarlands to the west. Over thousands of years, erosional forces have carried boulders composed of this sandstone down from boulder fields located higher up along the mountain ridges.  This process has left the streambed of Roaring Fork and the flats in the Roaring Fork valley virtually covered with sandstone rocks of all sizes. Farmers who lived at Roaring Fork, the Sugarlands, and Greenbrier were continually moving and stacking these rocks, creating the characteristic rock walls that still criss-cross these areas today.

Roaring Fork Historic District

Between 1800 and 1810, the first permanent Euro-American settlers arrived in the White Oak Flats area around what is now Gatlinburg. In the following decades, their descendants spread out into the surrounding coves and valleys. Richard Reagan (1776–1829), the son of one of these pioneers, settled on a large plot of land just south of Gatlinburg along LeConte Creek. Some of Reagan's children settled to the west in the Sugarlands, while some of them moved east to the hollow along Roaring Fork, which was then known as "Spruce Flats."  By 1900, three of Reagan's grandsons, Alfred Reagan (1856–1928), Aaron Reagan, and John H. Reagan were still farming along the stream, just above Gatlinburg.

The Bales family settled in the upper section of Roaring Fork sometime in the 1830s or earlier. Caleb Bales (1839–1913), apparently a son or nephew of the first Bales to settle on Roaring Fork, owned a farm just south of the Reagan lands. Caleb's sons Jim Bales (1869–1939) and Ephraim Bales (1867–1936) would spend most of their lives on Roaring Fork farming land inherited from their father.

As the Bales and Reagan families lived on adjoining lands, it's no surprise that they intermarried. Caleb Bales married one of Richard Reagan's granddaughters, Elizabeth, in 1861. Ephraim Bales married a great-granddaughter of Richard Reagan, Minerva, in 1889. Caleb's daughter, Martha, married Alfred Reagan in 1879.

Uppermost on Roaring Fork, near where the stream absorbs Surry Creek, were farms owned by the Clabo family, Gilbert Ogle, and Jasper Mellinger.  Former homesteads can usually be identified by the preponderance of young tuliptrees (rather than the more common hemlock or oak), as tuliptrees are the quickest to reclaim previously cultivated land.

Around 1850, the residents of Roaring Fork constructed a crude road connecting the area to White Oak Flats (this old road is now a stop along the Roaring Fork Motor Nature Trail). By 1900, the community had matured into a mountain hamlet with its own school, church, general store, and tub mills.

In 1976, the Roaring Fork Historic District was listed on the National Register of Historic Places.

The Jim Bales Place
The first historic stop along the Roaring Fork Motor Nature Trail is the Jim Bales Place, a farm which Jim Bales inherited from his father, Caleb.  Jim, born James Wesley Bales in 1869, lived here for much of his life. He married Emma Ogle, a granddaughter of Gilbert Ogle, whose farm was located just above the Bales Place. As Bales got older, the farm passed on to other families, one of which erected a modern frame house on the land (known as the "fancy house") where they entertained visitors.

When the Park Service gained control of the land in the 1930s, the frame house was torn down. The Alex Cole Cabin, being more representative of the pioneer days of Appalachia, was moved to the farm from the Sugarlands.  Bales' corn crib and barn remain, however.

The Ephraim Bales Place

Just below the Jim Bales place is the farm of Ephraim and Minerva Bales. The other  were mostly wooded, which the Bales family used for construction material and firewood.

The Bales cabin was a double cabin with a passageway known as a "dog trot" in between. The space between the two halves was relatively cool in summer and warm in winter, making it attractive to dogs. Both halves of the cabin have their own chimney. With the exception of a back porch, the cabin remains largely as it was when the Bales family lived in here in the early 1900s.
Along with the cabin, Bales' corn crib, hog pen, and barn are still standing today, just a few yards from the cabin. A rock wall and paling fence behind the cabin are representative of the two major barriers used in the Northern Smokies in the late 19th and early 20th centuries.

The Alfred Reagan Place

Alfred Reagan, a descendant of the area's first settlers, owned a small farm just below the Ephraim Bales Place. Reagan was a jack-of-all-trades, operating the Roaring Fork community's blacksmith shop, general store, and its most consistent grist mill. Reagan was also a part-time preacher at the Roaring Fork Church, for which he donated the land and helped build.

Of all the buildings on Reagan's farm, only his cabin and mill remain today. Due to its sawboard paneling and coat of paint, Reagan's cabin stands out among historical structures in the Smokies today. The cabin's design is known as a "saddlebag" design, which involves two cabins constructed around a single chimney.  A kitchen area was added later.

The Reagan mill is a standard tub mill, with a flume redirecting water from Roaring Fork to power a tub-wheel turbine. The turbine turns a grindstone which breaks down corn and wheat into cornmeal and flour. Reagan's mill was well-designed and well-positioned. It is said that when other mills lacked sufficient water power due to low water levels, Reagan's mill would continue to operate.

Alex Cole Cabin

The Alex Cole Cabin is the last surviving structure from the Sugarlands community proper. Built by mountain guide Albert Alexander Cole, it has been moved from its original site to the Jim Bales Place along the Roaring Fork Motor Nature Trail.

The Roaring Fork Motor Nature Trail
The Roaring Fork Motor Nature Trail is a narrow one-way road that is open to vehicular traffic (cars and small pickup trucks only) in Spring, Summer, and Fall. Along with the historic district, the road passes by two overlooks and a forest that is representative of mid-level elevations in the Smokies.

The trail begins just past the Rainbow Falls Trailhead on Cherokee Orchard Road, and slowly ascends Piney Mountain, topping out at an overlook on the mountain's northern slopes (the overlook's elevation is roughly ). Just past the overlook, the road passes numerous large chestnut tree blowdowns. These trees, which often grew to 5–6 feet in diameter, were killed off by a blight in the 1930s.

As the road descends Piney Mountain, it passes a parking lot at the Trillium Gap Trailhead. This hiking trail leads past Grotto Falls and Trillium Gap en route to the summit of Mount Le Conte. Trillium Gap — the gap between Brushy Mountain and the main Le Conte massif — was named by Horace Albright, who observed the trillium-filled area in the 1920s.

Past the Trillium Gap Trailhead, the road steadies as it enters the upper reaches of the Roaring Fork hollow. Patches of young tuliptrees mark the former location of the Clabo and Ogle farms. Immediately after the road crosses Roaring Fork, the Jim Bales Place is visible on the right (east). The Grapeyard Ridge Trail, which connects Roaring Fork to Greenbrier, begins just behind the barn. Past the Jim Bales Place are the Ephraim Bales Place and Alfred Reagan Place.

The road continues to descend past the historic district, passing along the way a parking lot that allows for an upclose view of Roaring Fork. A thin waterfall known as "The Place of a Thousand Drips" is the last stop along the motor trail before it re-enters Gatlinburg.

See also
 Noah Ogle Place
 List of rivers of Tennessee

References

External links

Great Smoky Mountains National Park Autumn Drives — Contains information on the Roaring Fork Motor Nature Trail
Great Smoky Mountains National Park Waterfalls — Contains information on Grotto Falls
Great Smoky Mountains National Park: Plan Your Visit: Roaring Fork
Great Smoky Mountains National Park: Maps

Historic districts on the National Register of Historic Places in Tennessee
Landforms of Sevier County, Tennessee
Communities of the Great Smoky Mountains
Appalachian culture in Tennessee
National Register of Historic Places in Great Smoky Mountains National Park
Buildings and structures in Sevier County, Tennessee
Gatlinburg, Tennessee
Rivers of Tennessee
National Register of Historic Places in Sevier County, Tennessee